The Progressive Labour Party was a political party in Dominica. It contested the 1975 general elections, receiving 4.2% of the vote, but failing to win a seat. It did not run in any subsequent elections.

References

Political parties in Dominica
Labour parties